William Woodward may refer to:

Politicians
William Woodward (South Carolina politician), U.S. Representative from South Carolina
William Culham Woodward (1885–1957), Lieutenant Governor of British Columbia
William Woodward (MP) for Dunwich

Others
 William Woodward (fl. 1851), English pharmacist who invented gripe water
 William Woodward (cricketer) (died 1862), English cricketer
 William G. Woodward (1808–1871), Justice of the Iowa Supreme Court
 William Woodward (artist) (1859–1939), American artist and educator
 William Creighton Woodward (1866–1949), American doctor and lawyer
 William Woodward Sr. (1876–1953), American banker and owner of Belair Stud
 William Woodward (rower) (1920-1987), British Olympic rower
 William Woodward Jr. (Billy, 1920–1955), banker and "The Shooting of the Century" victim
 William Woodward (artist, born 1935), American painter and muralist

See also
Billy Woodward (disambiguation)
William Woodward House, Massachusetts